Gauss's lemma in number theory gives a condition for an integer to be a quadratic residue. Although it is not useful computationally, it has theoretical significance, being involved in some proofs of quadratic reciprocity.

It made its first appearance in Carl Friedrich Gauss's third proof (1808) of quadratic reciprocity and he proved it again in his fifth proof (1818).

Statement of the lemma 

Consider the integers

and their least positive residues modulo . These residues are all distinct, so there are ( of them.

Then

where  is the Legendre symbol.

Example 
Taking  = 11 and  = 7, the relevant sequence of integers is
 7, 14, 21, 28, 35.
After reduction modulo 11, this sequence becomes
 7, 3, 10, 6, 2.
Three of these integers are larger than 11/2 (namely 6, 7 and 10), so  = 3. Correspondingly Gauss's lemma predicts that
 
This is indeed correct, because 7 is not a quadratic residue modulo 11.

The above sequence of residues
 7, 3, 10, 6, 2
may also be written
 −4, 3, −1, −5, 2.
In this form, the integers larger than 11/2 appear as negative numbers. It is also apparent that the absolute values of the residues are a permutation of the residues
 1, 2, 3, 4, 5.

Proof 
A fairly simple proof, reminiscent of one of the simplest proofs of Fermat's little theorem, can be obtained by evaluating the product
 
modulo p in two different ways. On one hand it is equal to
 

The second evaluation takes more work.
 
Since  counts those multiples  which are in the latter range, and since for those multiples,  is in the first range, we have
 
Indeed, we have

But there are exactly  of them, so their values are a rearrangement of the integers . Therefore,
 
Comparing with our first evaluation, we may cancel out the nonzero factor
 
and we are left with
 
This is the desired result, because by Euler's criterion the left hand side is just an alternative expression for the Legendre symbol .

Applications 
Gauss's lemma is used in many, but by no means all, of the known proofs of quadratic reciprocity.

For example, Gotthold Eisenstein used Gauss's lemma to prove that if  is an odd prime then

and used this formula to prove quadratic reciprocity. By using elliptic rather than circular functions, he proved the cubic and quartic reciprocity laws.

Leopold Kronecker used the lemma to show that

Switching  and  immediately gives quadratic reciprocity.
 
It is also used in what are probably the simplest proofs of the "second supplementary law"

Higher powers

Generalizations of Gauss's lemma can be used to compute higher power residue symbols. Subsequently, Eisenstein used third- and fourth-power versions to prove cubic and quartic reciprocity.

nth power residue symbol

Let k be an algebraic number field with ring of integers  and let  be a prime ideal.

Then no two distinct th roots of unity can be congruent modulo .

This can be proved by contradiction, beginning by assuming that  mod , . From the definition of roots of unity, 

and dividing by  gives 

Letting  and taking residues mod ,

Therefore, the assumption that two distinct roots are congruent is false.

and since  mod ,

is well-defined and congruent to a unique th root of unity ζns.

It can be proven that

if and only if there is an  such that  mod .

1/n systems
Let  be the multiplicative group of the th roots of unity, and let  be representatives of the cosets of  Then  is called a  system mod 

In other words, there are  numbers in the set  and this set constitutes a representative set for 

The numbers , used in the original version of the lemma, are a 1/2 system (mod ).

Then  is a  system mod

The lemma for nth powers
Gauss's lemma may be extended to the th power residue symbol as follows. Let  be a primitive th root of unity,  a prime ideal,  (i.e.  is coprime to both  and ) and let  be a   system mod 

and the th-power residue symbol is given by the formula

Proof
The proof of the th-power lemma uses the same ideas that were used in the proof of the quadratic lemma.

Assume that  =  = , i.e.

and

Then

Then on the one hand, by the definition of the power residue symbol,

and on the other hand, since  is a permutation,

so

and the theorem follows from the fact that no two distinct th roots of unity can be congruent (mod ).

Relation to the transfer in group theory 

Applying the machinery of the transfer to this collection of coset representatives, we obtain the transfer homomorphism

Gauss's lemma may then be viewed as a computation that explicitly identifies this homomorphism as being the quadratic residue character.

See also 

 Zolotarev's lemma

References

Articles containing proofs
Lemmas in number theory
Modular arithmetic
Quadratic residue
Squares in number theory